Zheng Tao (born 25 December 1990) is a Chinese para swimmer and five-time Paralympic champion. He is known as the "armless swimmer". He made a world record by winning 4 gold medals in Tokyo 2020 Paralympic.

Early life
Zheng lost his arms due to an electric shock when he was a child.

Swimming career
In 2004 Zheng took up the sport of Swimming and in 2010 he made his international swimming debut when Zheng represented China at the World Championships in Eindhoven, Netherlands.

Zheng competed in his first Paralympic Games at the 2012 London Paralympics, where he won the gold medal in a close race in the 100m backstroke S6 final.

At the 2016 Summer Paralympics in Rio de Janeiro, he suffered a lower back injury but still won the gold medal at the Men's 100 metre backstroke S6 event with a world record of 1:10.84, two seconds faster than the previous record, which was established by himself in 2015. He then caught the stomach flu on the day of the 50-metre butterfly S6 final, and lost to his teammate Xu Qing, winning a silver medal in the event.

At the 2020 Summer Paralympics in Tokyo, he won the gold medal at the Men's Butterfly S5 event with a world record of  30.62, the gold medal at the Men's Backstroke S5 event with a world record of 31.42 and the gold medal at the 50m Freestyle S5. He also won the gold medal at the Mixed 4x50m Freestyle Relay - 20 Points.

References

External links
 

1990 births
Living people
Paralympic gold medalists for China
Paralympic swimmers of China
Chinese male backstroke swimmers
Chinese male butterfly swimmers
Chinese male medley swimmers
Chinese male freestyle swimmers
S6-classified Paralympic swimmers
Paralympic bronze medalists for China
Paralympic medalists in swimming
Swimmers at the 2012 Summer Paralympics
Medalists at the 2012 Summer Paralympics
Swimmers at the 2016 Summer Paralympics
Medalists at the 2016 Summer Paralympics
Swimmers at the 2020 Summer Paralympics
Medalists at the 2020 Summer Paralympics
Sportspeople with limb difference
Chinese amputees
21st-century Chinese people